Winston Churchill is a neighbourhood in Lethbridge, Alberta.

Education 
The area is served by Winston Churchill High School.

References 

Neighbourhoods in Lethbridge
Winston Churchill